Richard Compton (March 2, 1938 – August 11, 2007) was an American actor, director and writer, primarily in television.

Compton had small parts as an actor in film and television series, including minor roles in two episodes of Star Trek: The Original Series. Years later, he directed an episode of Star Trek: The Next Generation. Other directorial credits included episodes of The X-Files, Charmed, Sliders, Babylon 5 and Miami Vice, as well as the films Macon County Line and its sequel, Return to Macon County (both of which he also co-wrote).

Compton was the husband of actress Veronica Cartwright and the brother-in-law of actress Angela Cartwright.

Selected filmography
 Welcome Home, Soldier Boys (1972)
 The Ransom (1977)
 Deadman's Curve (1978)
 Ravagers (1979)

References

External links
 

1938 births
2007 deaths
American television directors
American male film actors
American male television actors
20th-century American male actors